Papilys is a small town in Panevėžys County, in northeastern Lithuania. According to the 2011 census, the town has a population of 236 people.

References

Towns in Lithuania
Towns in Panevėžys County
Biržai District Municipality
Novoalexandrovsky Uyezd